Glycoprotein 100,  gp100 or Melanocyte protein PMEL is 661 amino acids long and is a
type I transmembrane glycoprotein enriched in melanosomes, which are the melanin-producing organelles in melanocytes.
This protein is involved in melanosome maturation.

The gp100 protein is a melanoma antigen i.e. a tumor-associated antigen.

Short fragments of it have been used to develop the gp100 cancer vaccine which is or contains gp100:209-217(210M).

Hydrophilic recombinant gp100 protein (HR-gp100) has been topically applied on human intact skin in vitro, and used as a vaccine in a mouse model. It was demonstrated that HR-gp100 permeates into human skin, and is processed and presented by human dendritic cells. In the mouse model, an HR-gp100-based vaccine triggered antigen-specific T cell responses, as shown by proliferation assays, ELISA and intracellular staining for IFN-γ.

Glycoprotein 100 (GP100) is a 661 amino acid long protein that contains differentiation antigens.  GP100 is a membrane bound protein that is expressed in melanocytes and pigmented cells in the retina, and in most malignant melanomas. It has widely studied to be used as a target for melanoma immunotherapy. GP100 works in functions melanogenesis, melanosome biogenesis, and melanin polymerization (Eisenberg) 

There are different sequences of the GP100 peptide that could be used for immunization against tumors. According to a case study, modifications of GP100 such as GP100-209 and GP100-208 have shown a greater number of antigen specific CTL's (cytotoxic T lymphocytes) which can target and kill cancer cells (Eisenberg).

References

 

Oncology